Ramchandarpur refers to an administrative block/Tehsil/Taluka of Balrampur district, Chhattisgarh, India

Ramchandrapur may also refer to:

 Ramchandrapur, West Bengal, a census town in Sankrail CD Block  under Sankrail in Sadar subdivision of Howrah district, West Bengal, India
 Ramchandrapur, Sonarpur, census town in South 24 Parganas district, West Bengal, India
 Ramchandrapur, Purulia, a village in Santuri CD Block in Raghunathpur subdivision of Purulia district, West Bengal, India 
 Ramchandrapur, Purba Medinipur, a village in Egra subdivision of Purba Medinipur district, West Bengal, India

See also 
Ramachandrapuram (disambiguation)